Leo Martin Bill (born 31 August 1980) is an English actor, best known for his role as James Brocklebank in the 2006 film The Living and the Dead, as well as The Fall, Alice in Wonderland, and the FX/BBC One drama series Taboo. He is son of actors Sheila Kelley and Stephen Bill.

Filmography

Film

Television

Theatre

In 2010 he appeared as Alistair Ryle in Posh by Laura Wade at the Royal Court Theatre in London. In 2011, he played Charles Surface in Richard Brinsley Sheridan's The School for Scandal at the Barbican Theatre, directed by Deborah Warner. In 2015 he appeared as Horatio in a production of Hamlet at the same venue, alongside Benedict Cumberbatch in the title role.

Awards and nominations

References

External links

1980 births
English male film actors
English male television actors
Living people
People from Warwickshire
21st-century English male actors
Alumni of RADA